The Thomas G. Carpenter Library is the library at the University of North Florida. It is named after the university's founding president, Thomas G. Carpenter.

History 
Construction first began on the library in 1978, and the building was opened October 1, 1980. A dedication ceremony took place a year later, on August 15, 1981. The architects for the original building were Helman, Hurley, Charvat, Peacock. In 2004, a $22.5 million, four-story addition and renovation project began to handle the university's growing student population. The architects for the addition were Rink Design Partnerships, Inc, and the contractor was Turner Construction. A Starbucks has also been added to a lobby of the original building. The addition opened December 2005 and was celebrated October 5th, 2006.

Services
Currently the Library has 300 public workstations, 17 group study rooms, 37 carrels, 21 faculty, 24 support staff, over 1.4 million microform units, over 800 videos, 13,000 electronic journals, over 52,000 electronic books, and over 800,000 volumes. Electronic resources are available off campus. Free wireless Internet is provided throughout the entire building and laptops are available for checkout to currently enrolled students. Special Borrower ID's are also available for purchase by non-UNF students which allow for a rental of up to 10 items. Special borrower ID's are free per-semester for students enrolled in Florida State College of Jacksonville. The building can seat 2,000 patrons. The library also holds the university's archives and special collections.

References

External links
 Library Fact Sheet
 Design Website
 Official Twitter

Library buildings completed in 1980
Libraries in Florida
Florida
University of North Florida
1980 establishments in Florida